Fudbalski klub Inđija Toyo Tires is a football club based in the city of Inđija, Serbia. They compete in the Serbian First League, the second tier of the national league system.

During Yugoslavia the club mainly participated in the amateur ranks of competition.

The club's biggest success were two promotions to the Serbian SuperLiga for 2010–11 and 2019–20 seasons.

History
FK Inđija was established in 1933 as a Yugoslav Railways employees club, initially named ŽAK Inđija and later FK Železničar Inđija. In 1969, Železničar was renamed to FK PIK Inđija. In 1975 the name changed, this time to FK Agrounija after the club's sponsor at that time. In 1994, the name become FK Inđija and it lasts until nowadays, exception was the period between 2001 and 2003 when for sponsorship reasons the clubs was known as FK Brazda Coop.

In 1941, they won the Novi Sad Football Subassociation First League. Later during the SFR Yugoslavia period, the club competed mostly in the third national level. On several occasions they played the qualifiers for the Yugoslav Second League, until they finally achieved promotion to it in 1992. The next notable achievement was in season 2005–06 when they reached the quarter-finals of the Serbia and Montenegro Cup, and also won the Serbian league – group Vojvodina and got promoted to the Serbian First League (national second level).

In 2010, FK Inđija finished first in the Serbian First League and was promoted to the Serbian SuperLiga, Serbia's highest professional football league, an achievement they would repeat in 2019.

Honours
Serbian First League: 2009–10
Novi Sad Football Subassociation: 1941
Serbian League Vojvodina: 2005–06

Current squad

First team

Notable players

Dragoljub Pejović was one of the most successful players of the club and later in his career his he played for FK Vojvodina and FK Hajduk Kula.  Other players are Bojan Banjac who after playing with FK Inđija played for Lille in France, Ratko Vukčević who played for FK Obilić and Ljubiša Kekić.  Altogether there have been 35 players from FK Inđija that played in top leagues, not only in Serbia but in other European leagues as well.

Players that played in the club and that have national team appearances are Bojan Neziri (Serbia), Jovan Tanasijević and Nikola Vukčević (Montenegro), Zoran Janković (Bulgaria), Yaw Antwi (Ghana), Diego Bardanca (Philippines) and Badara Badji (Senegal).

Stadium

Stadion FK Inđija is a stadium among longest sport tradition in Srem and Vojvodina, it is located in near center of the town, near railroad station and main railroad direction Belgrade-Subotica-Budapest. It is built on a place where locomotive depot was at. For decades it is a center of main football and other sports in town.

At the time when FK Železničar was founded to today, FK Inđija, the pitch was made and with it wooden stands with a roof 600 was the capacity. Changing rooms were made in 1962. In 1970, the stands went under renovation because the wood started to fall apart. In 2006, the stadium got its today look When first built the stadium could hold up to 4,000 to 5,000 people. Over the years the capacity dropped due to safety precautions, the capacity fell to 3,500.

In 2006, FK Inđija has revealed plans for a new stadium, the capacity is going to be 10,000. When finished it will fulfill the club's ambitions. The club's president has stated that FK Inđija goals are to be a standard club in the Serbian SuperLiga and to play in the UEFA Europa League. The new stadium is expected to fulfill UEFA's criteria for playing games in the UEFA Europa League, and is expected to be finished in 2012.

Fans
Fans of FK Inđija are called "Zelena Armija" (Green Army).

References

External links
Official website  
Zelena Armija fans
Club profile and squad at Srbijafudbal
Inđija Stats at Utakmica.rs

Football clubs in Serbia
Football clubs in Vojvodina
Association football clubs established in 1933
1933 establishments in Serbia